Bigflo et Oli is a French hip-hop duo from Toulouse. The duo is composed of two brothers, Florian "Bigflo" Ordoñez and Olivio "Oli" Ordoñez. Their debut album La Cour des grands was released in 2015 and received a gold record award in France less than four months after being released, then went platinum, making them the youngest French rappers to receive this award.

Their second album, La Vraie Vie, came out on June 23, 2017. The album was certified gold record three weeks later, platinum record three months later, on September 18, 2017, double platinum record in early December 2017 and triple platinum record in March 2018 with over 300,000 sales.

Their third album, La Vie de rêve, was released on November 23, 2018. It earned gold record status within 10 days of its release, then went platinum one month after its release.

As of October 2019, they have sold over a million copies of their albums.

Biography

1993–2005: Early life 
Florian and Olivio were born from an Argentinian father, Fabian, and a French mother of Algerian descent, and grew up in the Minimes district of Toulouse, in the Occitanie region. They both received a solid musical and instrumental training from childhood, Olivio studying trumpet and Florian the drums and piano at the conservatoire de Toulouse. It was after hearing Sully Sefil's song J'voulais, released in 2001, that the two brothers started rapping, aged nine and six respectively. Their parents had already introduced them to music: their father is a salsa singer and their mother listened to a lot of chanson française when they were children (Jacques Brel, Charles Aznavour and Francis Cabrel in particular).

Bigflo is the stage name of Florian José Ordonez. After obtaining his scientific baccalauréat, Florian spent a year studying at university, in LEA (Applied Foreign Languages), then decided to stop to devote himself entirely to music. He has been playing drums and piano since the age of 13, in addition to writing his own songs.

He began writing at the age of six and became involved in musical creation while preparing his economics and social sciences baccalauréat, which he obtained in 2014. Both brothers attended the lycée Saint-Sernin in Toulouse.

2005–2014: Beginnings 
Bigflo and Oli published their first music video on YouTube in 2005 when they were children, and completely unknown. It reached, at the time, about 400 views. They later released another clip, "Fiers d'être toulousain" in which they already show their love for their hometown, Toulouse. The two brothers grew up, keeping on writing and composing, and started to scour the local scenes as high school students. They soon made a name for themselves by taking part in rap battles, such as Rap Contenders. They play several opening acts, including French rap heavyweights like Sexion d'Assaut and La Rumeur. On July 14, 2011, they play alongside Cali for the French Fête nationale, in Toulouse. They have also shared the stage with Orelsan, 1995 or IAM.

In 2011, they release their "C'est que le début" music video. In July 2012, they publish their second clip alongside Orelsan, "Pourquoi pas nous ?" on YouTube. In October 2013, the band signs on the Polydor label. In 2014, they release an extended play called Le Trac. It contains five songs including "Monsieur tout le monde", which reveals the band to the mainstream audience. The clip, directed by Julien Hosmalin, features comedian Kyan Khojandi and tells the tragic destiny of an Average Joe who ends up losing his temper. Also published in 2014, their video "Gangsta" is shot in Toulouse.

2015–2016: La Cour des grands 
On September 11, 2015, their debut album La Cour des grands is certified gold record and they become the youngest French rappers to receive this award, at the age of 22 and 19. The duo gradually established themselves as a major force in French rap, going so far as to be considered by Akhenaton, member of IAM, as the next generation of French rap. He explains in 2016:
In the face of rising success, the two brothers say that "what is happening is a childhood dream come true." In June 2015, they make a brief appearance in a YouTube video on the Squeezie channel.

In March 2015, they put out the music video for the song "Nous aussi", from their album La Cour des grands. The clip was directed by the same director as "Monsieur tout le monde". It involves three podcasters: Jhon Rachid, Baptiste Lorber as well as Jérôme Niel, famous for his tutorials broadcast on Canal+'s Grand Journal. Their music video "Le Cordon" came out in May 2015 .This stop motion clip directed by Nicolas Carnol tells the story of a mother and her aborted child, confronting two opposing yet complementary perspectives. After touring France in 2015, the two brothers set off on a second tour in 2016, where they played at a number of major summer festivals. Among other things, they took part in the 3rd edition of AbbéRoad, a charity concert of the Abbé-Pierre Foundation.

2017–2018: La Vraie Vie 
Bigflo and Oli went live on Facebook on April 30, 2017, and announced the name of their second album, La Vraie Vie, scheduled for release on June 23, 2017. They also released on May 2, 2017, a song by the same name as well as an 8-minute video clip, shot at the Mont Blanc massif. On May 12, 2017, they unveiled a second single, "Alors Alors". On June 2, the duo released another music video, featuring Jamel Debbouze, called "Personne". On June 16, 2017, seven days before the album release, Bigflo and Oli announced the release of a clothing brand called Visionnaire.

The album featured a number of well-known guests such as Belgian singer Stromae who co-wrote the song "Dommage", American rapper Busta Rhymes on "Ça va trop vite" and French rap star JoeyStarr on "Trop tard". On the eponymous song "La Vraie Vie", BigFlo took a dig at rapper Orelsan, who turned down a collaboration because of a busy schedule. In July 2017, the two brothers reappeared on Squeezie's YouTube channel in a video where the three of them created a song in under an hour. The video attracted more than ten million views. The album's fourth music video came out on September 8, 2017, and featured the song "Dommage", where Panayotis Pascot and Pascale Arbillot play the roles of the characters mentioned in the song. The album was a huge success and was certified platinum on September 18, 2017, about 3 months after its release.

At the end of September 2017, Bigflo and Oli appeared once again with Squeezie with the same idea as the first video, this time the three of them making a video clip in less than twelve hours. On December 15, 2017, the group released a fifth clip, for the song "Salope!".

In January 2018, the duo is nominated in 2 categories of the Victoires de la Musique: "Urban Music Album of the Year" with La Vraie Vie and "Original Song of the Year" with "Dommage". They performed this title live with a 60-piece amateur choir from Chabeuil, discovered through to their YouTube video where they covered the song. That evening, the duo won the "Original Song of the Year" award, thanks to audience votes. Following this victory, Oli had to dye his hair blue, a challenge he took up with his big brother, following the same pattern as when the rappers won the NRJ Music Awards, when Oli finished with blond hair.

At the end of June 2018, the two brothers released a new track in collaboration with French DJ Petit Biscuit, called "Demain". About a month later, the duo released the associated video clip, mainly consisting of shots of fans dancing during their festival appearances.

2018–present: La Vie de rêve 
Bigflo and Oli announced on September 8, 2018, in an Instagram live show the release of their new album La Vraie vie 2 as a direct sequel to La Vraie vie, scheduled for release in November 2018. The album will include Florian's solo, the song "Demain" released a few months earlier, as well as the song about their mother and new features. However, on October 3, 2018, the brothers announced that it would finally be called La Vie de rêve, as they felt that the previous name would sound too much like a bonus album or an album that could not be listened to without having listened to the previous one.

On October 26, 2018, the first single (excluding "Demain") from their third album is released, Nous Aussi 2. The accompanying music video exceeded one million views in less than a day. The next single was released a few days later, on October 31, and was entitled "Plus Tard".

The album was released on November 23, 2018 and was a huge success, selling more than 44,000 copies in the first week, almost twice as many as its predecessor and was certified gold record after only 10 days, then platinum in less than a month. Adding to the album's success, it was given the "Urban Music Album of the Year" award during the 2019 Victoires de la Musique, where the siblings were also named "Male Group or Artist of the Year". On February 11, 2019, they released the video for "Rentrez chez vous", song they performed a few days earlier at the Victoires ceremony.

They went on a year-long tour, and notably played two days in a row at Stadium de Toulouse, where no concerts had been given since Michael Jackson's 1992 performance during his Dangerous World Tour. They also released "Allez le Stade", a song dedicated to the Stade Toulousain's 20th French Championship title. In July 2019, they declared their intention to pause their career after their tour and the summer festivals, in order to "settle down and recover".

In 2020, they nonetheless released two EPs, Freestyles Insolents, compilation of their YouTube-released freestyle tracks, and Un été quand même, joint release with Bon Entendeur. They also appeared on L.E.J's "Tu es" and Marseille-based rapper Jul's "Que ça dure".

Discography

Albums

Extended plays

Singles

As lead artists

As featured artists

Other charted songs

Awards 

|-
! 2016
| Prix Talents W9
| 
| Bigflo & Oli
| 
| 
|-
! rowspan="2" | 2017
| Grand prix SACEM
| Rolf Marbot Song of the Year Award
| "Je suis"
| 
| 
|-
| NRJ Music Award
| Francophone Duo/Group of the Year
| Bigflo & Oli
| 
| 
|-
! rowspan="6" | 2018
| Aficia Awards
| Francophone Duo/Group of the Year
| Bigflo & Oli
| 
| 
|-
| MTV Europe Music Award
| Best French Act
| Bigflo & Oli
| 
| 
|-
| rowspan="2" | NRJ Music Award
| Francophone Duo/Group of the Year
| Bigflo & Oli
| 
! rowspan="2" | 
|-
| Video of the Year
| "Demain"
| 
|-
| rowspan="2" | Victoires de la Musique
| Original Song of the Year
| "Dommage"
| 
! rowspan="2" | 
|-
| Urban Music Album of the Year
| La Vraie Vie
| 
|-
! rowspan="4" | 2019
| rowspan="2" | NRJ Music Award
| Francophone Duo/Group of the Year
| Bigflo & Oli
| 
| 
|-
| Video of the Year
| "Promesses"
| 
| 
|-
| rowspan="2" | Victoires de la Musique
| Male Group or Artist of the Year
| Bigflo & Oli
| 
! rowspan="2" | 
|-
| Urban Music Album of the Year
| La Vie de rêve
|

Distinctions 
On March 23, 2017, they were made chevaliers de l'Ordre des Arts et des Lettres by the Minister of Culture.

Notes and references 

French hip hop groups
French musical duos
Sibling musical duos
Musicians from Toulouse
French people of Argentine descent
French people of Algerian descent
Chevaliers of the Ordre des Arts et des Lettres
Musical groups established in 2005
Musical groups from Occitania (administrative region)